Philip Banks may refer to:
 Philip Banks (The Fresh Prince of Bel-Air), fictional character
 Philip Banks III (born 1964), former Chief of the New York Police Department
 Philip Norton Banks (1889–1964), British colonial police officer